Michael Desanto (born 1953) from Victoria is an Australian Paralympic athlete.  He competed without winning any medals at the 1984 New York/Stoke Mandeville Paralympics. At the 1988 Seoul Paralympics, he won a silver medal in the Men's 4x100 m Relay 1A–1C event and a  bronze medal in the Men's 4x200 m Relay 1A–1C event.

References

External links
Michael Desanto

Paralympic athletes of Australia
Athletes (track and field) at the 1984 Summer Paralympics
Athletes (track and field) at the 1988 Summer Paralympics
Paralympic silver medalists for Australia
Paralympic bronze medalists for Australia
Living people
Medalists at the 1988 Summer Paralympics
1953 births
Paralympic medalists in athletics (track and field)
Australian male wheelchair racers